The Tropicana Gold Mine is located 330 km northeast of Kalgoorlie, Western Australia. Since 2002, it has been jointly owned by AngloGold Ashanti (70% – manager) and Regis Resources (30%).

The Tropicana tenements consist of 12,500 km2 of land. It is located at the junction of the Yilgarn Craton and the Fraser Range Mobile Belt.

History
The Tropicana deposit was discovered in 2005. The nearby Havana deposit was discovered in 2006. Mining commenced in July 2012 and first ore was sent to the crushing circuit in July 2013. The first gold was poured on 26 September 2013.

The area has been seen as a new major Australian gold province, previously unexplored due to its remoteness, and dubbed the "Tropicana Gold Belt".

In May 2021, Regis Resources purchased Independence Group's 30 percent stake in the ownership of the mine for A$903 million.

Project
A pre-feasibility study carried out by AngloGold Ashanti in 2007–08 showed the mine capital cost would be A$500 million to $540m and could produce up to 430,000 ounces of gold a year.

The projects location at the western edge of the remote Great Victoria Desert constitutes one of the biggest barriers for the project, with 220 km of road having to be built to be able to access the future mine and a 40 megawatt power station being required to supply it with electricity.

The project is estimated at an initial mine life of 10 years, now extended to 15, with an annual production of around 330,000 to 400,000 ounces (9000–11,000 kg) of gold and an overall production of 3.6 million ounces (102,000 kg).

The decision for the mine to go ahead is expected in 2010 while mining is scheduled to begin in 2013. AngloGold Ashanti sold its 33% stake in the Boddington Gold Mine in early 2009 to Newmont, a move seen by analysts as the "logical thing" in order to be able to afford the expenditure of the Tropicana development.

The open pit at the mine is scheduled to be up to 6 km long, 1.5 km wide and up to 400 m deep.

The development of the mine was approved by boards of the two companies on 11 December 2010. Construction is to start in June 2011, while the first gold pour was scheduled for December 2013 at the time. The cost of the project is estimated to be in excess of A$700 million.

Environmental impact
The future mine site is expected to include the clearing of 3440ha of vegetation and is likely to emit up to 330,000 tonnes of carbon dioxide a year.

Production
Annual production figures of the mine:

References

Bibliography

External links 
 
 
 MINEDEX website: Tropicana Database of the Department of Mines, Industry Regulation and Safety
 Tropicana JV website

Gold mines in Western Australia
Surface mines in Australia
Shire of Menzies
AngloGold Ashanti
Underground mines in Australia
2013 establishments in Australia